Alessandra Marianelli (born 1986) is an Italian soprano. She made her professional debut in 2002 as Barbarina in Le nozze di Figaro and went on to sing leading roles in the opera houses of her native country and internationally. Her recordings include Amour in Orphée et Eurydice for Decca Records and Fiorilla in Il turco in Italia for Naxos Records. She also appeared in Carlos Saura's 2009 film Io, Don Giovanni.

Life and career
Marianelli was born in Pontedera in the Province of Pisa. She began her vocal studies in Pisa with Marina Billieri and Pieralba Soroga, with further study at the Conservatorio Mascagni in Livorno. In 2001, at the age of 15 and never having seen a live opera performance, she placed second in the Cascinalirica singing competition in Livorno. The following year she made her professional debut as Barbarina in Le nozze di Figaro at Pisa's Teatro Verdi. She won the Premio Spiros Argiris in 2004 and in December of that year appeared in the small off-stage role of "La voce dal cielo" (voice from heaven) in Don Carlo at the Teatro Comunale di Firenze. She would return there seven years later as Musetta in La bohème.

From 2004 onwards, Marinelli made a series of other house and role debuts in Italy, Belgium, Peru, Spain, and Monaco and sang over 30 different roles. These included Serpina in La serva padrona and Collette in Le devin du village at the Festival Pergolesi Spontini (2004); Nanetta in Falstaff at La Monnaie, Brussels (2006); Fiorilla in Il turco in Italia at the Rossini Opera Festival (2007);  Gilda in Rigoletto at the Teatro Municipal Alejandro Granda, Lima; Amour in Orphée et Eurydice at the Teatro Real, Madrid (2008); Kseniya  in Boris Godunov at the Teatro Regio di Torino (2010);  Micaëla in Carmen at the Teatro Comunale di Bologna (2010); Oscar in Un ballo in maschera at the Opéra de Monte-Carlo (2011); and Giulietta in Un giorno di regno at the Teatro Regio di Parma (2013).

Recordings

References

External links

Artist's page on Stage Door Artists' Management
Alessandra Marianelli on Operabase
Video: Alessandra Marianelli as Juliette and José Bros as Roméo in Gounod's Roméo et Juliette, streamed from the Teatro Carlo Felice (2012).

Italian operatic sopranos
1986 births
People from Pontedera
Living people
21st-century Italian  women opera singers